Leiserson is a surname. Notable people with the surname include:

Charles E. Leiserson (born 1953), computer scientist
William Morris Leiserson (1883–1957), labor relations scholar and mediator